

Events calendar

+12